The Kukusunda (Kukuhunda) is a river in Yakutia (Sakha Republic) and Krasnoyarsk Krai, Russia.

The river flows across an uninhabited area of Olenyoksky District marked by permafrost. A small stretch of its source area falls within the Evenkiysky District of Krasnoyarsk Krai.

Course  
The Kukusunda is a left tributary of the Arga-Sala. Its sources are in the southern part of the Anabar Plateau, part of the Central Siberian Plateau, south of an area of lakes. In its upper course the river flows across a wide floodplain where its channel forms meanders. The river flows roughly eastwards and southeastwards. Then it finally joins the left bank of the Arga-Sala river  from its mouth. 

The Kukusunda is fed mainly by snow. It is frozen yearly between mid October and the end of May or the beginning of June.

Tributaries 

Flora and fauna
The river and its tributaries flow across an area covered by typical Siberian taiga, composed mainly of larch and pine.
The main fish species in the Kukusunda are lenok, muksun, nelma, omul, least cisco, whitefish, taimen, grayling and pike.

See also
List of rivers of Russia

References

External links 
Fishing & Tourism in Yakutia
В поисках пещер древних людей на Арга-Сале

Rivers of the Sakha Republic
Rivers of Krasnoyarsk Krai
Tributaries of the Arga-Sala
Central Siberian Plateau